The 2002 DFS Classic was a women's tennis tournament played on grass courts at the Edgbaston Priory Club in Birmingham in the United Kingdom that was part of Tier III of the 2002 WTA Tour. It was the 21st edition of the tournament and was held from 10 June until 16 June 2002. First-seeded Jelena Dokić won the singles title.

Finals

Singles

 Jelena Dokić defeated  Anastasia Myskina 6–2, 6–3
 It was Dokić's 3rd title of the year and the 7th of her career.

Doubles

 Shinobu Asagoe /  Els Callens defeated  Kimberly Po-Messerli /  Nathalie Tauziat 6–4, 6–3
 It was Asagoe's 1st title of the year and the 1st of her career. It was Callens' only title of the year and the 7th of her career.

External links
 ITF tournament edition details

DFS Classic
Birmingham Classic (tennis)
DFS Classic
DFS Classic